Burke is a crater on Mercury.  Its name was adopted by the International Astronomical Union (IAU) on November 4, 2015. Burke is named for the American actress Billie Burke.

References

Impact craters on Mercury